"I'll Be Your Everything" is a song by the boy band Youngstown that served as the theme for the 1999 Walt Disney Pictures film Inspector Gadget. The song was written by Haim Saban, Shuki Levy, Steve Durham, Skee-Lo, Tim James and Josh Stevens and produced by the Groove Brothers.

The song had two versions, the Disney version, which incorporated words/names like "Go Go Gadget" and "Claw" and the album version, which has no reference to Inspector Gadget. The group had to record another version of the song, the "Disney" version because their album version had suggestive lyrics like "I can freak you with my gadget", "I knew the moment that we met I had to be inside of you, someone you won't forget. So don't say that you don't feel it too. I've opened up my heart and so the rest is up to you" and "No sweat, 'cause help is on the way, Don't worry 'cause I'm watching you, No need to be afraid" whereas the Disney version says "I just call out Go Go Gadget", "I knew the moment that we met I had to be a part of you, someone you won't forget. So don't say I'm like the other few. No matter what, it's going down, you'll find me next to you." and "No sweat, when Claw is on his way, Don't worry 'bout him catching you, Don't even be afraid".

The Disney version can be heard in the movie Inspector Gadget and the album version can be heard on Youngstown's debut album Let's Roll. The song peaked at #71 on the Billboard Hot 100 chart in August 1999.

References

1999 debut singles
Songs written by Tim James (musician)
1999 songs
Hollywood Records singles
Inspector Gadget